Chemetco was formerly one of the largest United States refiners of copper from recycled or residual sources.

Its maximum output of 120,000 tons per year was approximately half of the entire U.S. copper output from recycled copper.  The company website described Chemetco as one of the world's largest copper refiners and reported an estimated revenue in 1999 of $500 m. It was listed in 2000 as the 23rd-largest privately held company in the United States.

The company had a history of environmental problems over its entire career, along with problems managing its wastes and by-products. Eventually, it was convicted of water pollution offences spanning a decade, which contravened US federal law.  The company's former site is now a Superfund site on the National Priorities List.

History
The company originated on June 9, 1969 as an Illinois corporation, Chemico Metals Corporation. On 23 March 1970, it became a Delaware corporation. In 1973, the company changed its name to Chemetco. By 1980, it employed around 200 staff. By 2000, Chemetco was a member of the St Louis Minority Business Council.

On November 13, 2001, the company filed for Chapter 7 bankruptcy (liquidation) following conviction in a U.S. federal court and a fine of $3.86 million.
Chemetco and former CEO, Denis L. Feron were charged on four felony counts: Conspiracy to violate the Clean Water Act, violation of the Clean Water Act, and two counts of making false statements. The plant, which closed on Nov 1, 2001, was promptly sealed by the Environmental Protection Agency (EPA) and tagged for an assessment of public health hazards.

Location

The Chemetco site is in a flood plain near the Mississippi River in Madison County, Illinois. The nearest residential area is Mitchell, a small community approximately ½ mile to the southeast. The Lewis and Clark State Memorial Park is within sight of Chemetco's former premises.

The Chemetco site is above an aquifer used for domestic, agricultural and industrial water consumers in several nearby communities, including Edwardsville, Hartford, Roxana and Wood River. Parts of the wider area enclosing the Chemetco site to the south are also known as Chouteau Island.

Main site operations were conducted within a  area, but Chemetco also owned hundreds of acres of farm land. The ATSDR has described how "…Over the 30 years of plant operations, some of this was acquired to settle disputes with nearby farmers."

The Mississippi River and two tributaries, the Cahokia Canal and Long Lake, are within  of the site. Some local properties are served by wells. The wetlands area to the south of the site is popular with recreational fishermen.

Operation

Production
Under Denis L. Feron, Chemetco had been a major producer of high-purity copper derived from secondary sources – recycled and residual materials.

These were received at the plant in large quantities from wholesalers, and in smaller quantities from the corporation's own network of warehouses that spanned the United States and Canada. These enabled material to be graded and pre-sorted locally before refining at the plant.

Copper anodes (98% Cu purity) emerged from the furnace as an intermediate product. For a number of years, these were electrolyzed by Chemetco to produce a higher-purity copper cathode (99.98% Cu purity.) However, the company later discontinued electrolysis of its own copper and sold copper anodes, each weighing  to Asarco.

Refining process
Copper-bearing material was smelted to produce black copper, containing impurities such as lead, tin and zinc. Black copper was refined using oxygen, producing 98% copper, along with a zinc oxide residue and a slag containing lead, tin, nickel and a number of heavy metals.

What Chemetco described as "zinc oxide" was extracted from furnace flue gases using a scrubber system. The zinc oxide, along with the slag, became a waste product. The term "zinc oxide" was deliberately erroneous as lead, cadmium and other elements were also present.

The Agency for Toxic Substances and Disease Registry (ATSDR) has noted how the generation and management of waste by-products was a long-term issue for Chemetco, but also that Chemetco seemed to be unwilling to recognize its wastes as a problem:

"Chemetco company literature and statements have often emphasized that the facility recycled most materials and that waste streams were not generated. But the end result of this recycling activity was piled feedstock residues, smelting and solid residues, and accumulated liquids. Much of the material was stored directly on the ground, with little attempt to provide barriers or work practices to limit exposures."

Prosecution and conviction

On 18 September 1996, an enforcement officer for the Illinois Environmental Protection Agency (IEPA) discovered a hidden pipe, discharging toxic waste from the refinery into a lake connected to a tributary of the Mississippi River.

Investigations showed that the secret pipe had been active for ten years. A large area of wetland was contaminated with zinc oxide, lead, cadmium and other pollutants at several times the threshold for a public health hazard. Visible evidence of contamination extended five feet down into the bed of a lake on property owned by Chemetco.

During Grand Jury testimony, one witness estimated that the plant discharged waste through the pipe for 330 days out of 365. Thirteen employees testified to using the pipe to discharge contaminated water.

Additionally, Chemetco discharged contaminated storm water every time it rained on the plant. A pump was automatically triggered, discharging pollutant-laden storm water through the secret pipe. The prosecution calculated that this automatic process had occurred 948 times over a ten-year period.
It was also calculated that even if only  of rain fell, 1620 gallons of water would gather into a collection basin. From there, this large volume of contaminated water would be pumped into Long Lake.

Chemetco hampered the investigation of its illegal activity by making materially false statements.
Before sentencing, the court described Chemetco's conduct as "willful and egregious".

On 12 December 2008, Denis L. Feron, the former president of Chemetco, was placed on the federal EPA's 'most wanted' list. He had fled the USA before trial. Eventually, he paid a half-million dollars in restitution and all charges were dropped against him.

Air-borne dioxin production
A scientific study by the Centre for the Biology of Natural Systems (CBNS) Queens College of the City of New York, individually names Chemetco as one of the top ten individual contributors of dioxins deposition at eight Nunavut land receptors, from a total of 44,000 potential sources in the United States.
As the report puts it:

"…the effort detailed in this report is a response to the evidence that Nunavut is especially vulnerable to the long-range air transport of dioxin. Although there are no significant sources of dioxin in Nunavut or within 500 kilometers of its boundaries, dioxin concentrations in Inuit mothers’ milk are twice the levels observed in southern Quebec. This is due to the elevated dioxin content of the indigenous diet—traditional foods such as caribou, fish and marine mammals."

The source of the air-borne dioxin produced by Chemetco's refining process was coated wire, including PVC-covered wire, plastics and computer parts. These were routinely used as part of the mix of grades of scrap copper used to charge the furnaces.
Citing Buekens et al. 1997, an EPA report notes: "The presence of chlorinated plastics in copper scraps as a feed to smelters is believed to increase the CDD/CDF formation." (CDD's are dioxins and CDFs are polychlorinated dibenzofurans).

The ATSDR describes how "Because Chemetco had accepted material from a firm known to have dioxin contamination, USEPA investigated dioxin. On April 12, 1987, USEPA sampled an area of the Chemetco plant which was used to manage zinc oxide collected from the venturi scrubber system."

EPA testers found a dioxin concentration of 3.4 parts per billion. As a result, their toxological assessment unit ‘raised concerns about dioxins and furans in Long Lake sediments and the fish population.’ However, the ATSDR reports that these initial fears proved unfounded:

"In the summer of 1999, staff from the Illinois Department of Natural Resources and Illinois EPA collected fish samples from two sections of Long Lake. Buffalo and carp were collected closest to …the northern part of the lake where the illegal pipe discharged. Buffalo and crappie were collected from the southern section through Pontoon Beach. Fillet portions were analyzed for pesticides, polychlorinated biphenyls (PCBs), dioxins, and furans. No elevated levels of these chemicals were found."
This finding, in conjunction with those of Commoner et al. shows that Chemetco's dioxins were almost entirely released as smokestack emissions (also called flue gas stack) emissions.

Other known environmental problems
Chemetco had a long history of violations. For example, in August and September 1992, while taking air emission readings, Chemetco was caught using semi-articulated trucks and water sprinklers as a buffer in front of the air emission monitors. This was in contravention of the Clean Air Act, 42.

For a period, Chemetco was the single biggest producer of atmospheric lead in the United States.

In 1999, the United States made a civil claim against Chemetco under the Clean Air Act, 42.: "…Chemetco will pay a civil penalty of $305,267…" Chemetco was also required to provide injunctive relief "…including installation of a Continuous Particulate Mass Monitor System.

Chemetco produced high-purity cathodes using electrolysis. This electrolytic process used large amounts of sulfuric acid and according to the Agency for Toxic Substances and Disease Registry (ATSDR) would at times "…reportedly release a visible "acid mist" drifting onto nearby farm fields."

The ATSDR also notes how the electrolytic refining process also required the management of large amounts of acidic waste capable of dissolving heavy metals:

"…According to a 1983 Illinois EPA memo, the strong-acid electrolytic bath was believed to have been releasing material. Through the years, during many of the sampling events liquids were measured with low pH values (acidic) or very high pH values (caustic). The high pH levels may have resulted from the company using caustic materials to attempt to neutralize standing acidic surface water. Acidic conditions typically increase the solubility of metals, and allow more mobility of the metal contaminants".

Other hazardous liquids used at the site included halogenated solvents that may have been used for cleaning machine parts.

Postscript

Remediation

Three and a half years after the discovery of the secret pipe, Chemetco had failed to present an approvable plan for remediating the contaminated area.

When Chemetco shut down, the site was sealed and remediation began. However, the process was to prove protracted and several years later, it had not been possible to fully complete the process.

When interviewed in early 2005, the Illinois EPA inspector who discovered the secret pipe in 1996 was pessimistic about the chances of rapid remediation of the site. He suggested that the clear-up could take twenty years or so.

In 2006, it was reported that a Canadian firm wanted to tackle the challenge of safely extracting metallic content from the wastes on site.
Under a proposed plan needing feasibility study approval, the contractor outlined a deal under which it could extract valuable metals such as copper, zinc, tin, lead and aluminium from the site. One report describes how the bidder for this work would "…design, provide and install equipment at the site for about $10 million and provide another $3 million for other cleanup while Chemetco [Estate] would operate the plant and pay royalties and lease payments…"

The IEPA spoke approvingly of this proposed scheme under which non-recyclables would remain on site. If given a green light to go ahead, the work was estimated to take around ten years to complete.

Superfund Site
On March 4, 2010, the Chemetco site was added to the Superfund National Priorities List because of the lead, cadmium and zinc contamination at the site and of nearby wetlands and Long Lake. The lack of available resources at the bankrupt Chemetco or at the State of Illinois necessitated proposal of this site to the National Priorities List (NPL).  This will enable the use of Federal funds to build a CERCLA enforcement case and ensure clean up the site.  The U.S. Environmental Protection Agency will oversee the clean up of the site and affected areas.  After the site was listed on the NPL, U.S. EPA, with the support of Illinois EPA, began the search for potentially responsible parties (PRPs) who may be liable for the clean up.  In November 2011, U.S. EPA issued a General Notice of potential liability to a group of PRPs, and is currently working with a subgroup of them.  U.S. EPA plans to negotiate a settlement with PRPs for performance of the Remedial Investigation and Feasibility Study (RI/FS) for the site, which will define the nature and extent of contamination associated with the site and present options for the long-term remediation of affected areas.  Upon completion of the RI/FS Report, U.S. EPA will select a remedy for the site, with input from the community and stakeholders.

Copper industry
A trade magazine covering metals industry news has noted that "The closing of the Chemetco Inc. secondary smelter in Hartford, Ill., in 2001 marked the end of large-scale secondary copper smelting in the United States."

Brian Taylor, writing for Recycling Today in 2007, goes on to observe how

".. in its 2006 report on National Emission Standards for Hazardous Air Pollutants (NESHAP) to the Federal Register, the U.S. EPA notes, 'The secondary copper smelting plants that served as the basis for emissions estimates have all shut down, and no similar secondary copper smelters have been constructed.'" 

Taylor notes that Chemetco was one of five smelters used by the EPA to establish its standards. The others were: Cerro Copper Products in Sauget, Ill.; Franklin Smelting in Philadelphia; Gaston Recycling Industries in Gaston, S.C.; and the Southwire Co. plant in Carrollton, Ca.

See also

Agency for Toxic Substances and Disease Registry
Business ethics
Clean Air Act
Environmental issues in the United States
Environmental justice
Recycling in the United States

References

External links

 Scorecard site:comparative stats for Chemetco's lead and ozone emissions in 1999
Illinois EPA Director Issues Seal Order on Chemetco Property at Illinois Environmental Protection Agency
Copper: Statistics and Information at United States Geological Survey
Bankruptcy Chemetco Estate
Explanation of what constitutes a false statement under US federal law
Cease to Do Evil, Then Learn to Do at the Cultural Survival website

Recycling in the United States
Superfund sites in Illinois
American white-collar criminals
Companies based in Madison County, Illinois
Defunct companies based in Illinois
Renewable resource companies established in 1969
Renewable resource companies disestablished in 2001
American companies established in 1969
American companies disestablished in 2001
1969 establishments in Illinois
2001 disestablishments in Illinois
Companies that have filed for Chapter 7 bankruptcy
Privately held companies based in Illinois